BitClout is an open source blockchain-based social media platform. On the platform, users can post short-form writings and photos, award money to posts they particularly like by clicking a diamond icon, buy and sell "creator coins" (personalized tokens whose value depends on people's reputations), and create and sell non-fungible tokens. BitClout runs on a custom proof of work blockchain, and is a prototype of what can be built on DeSo (short for "Decentralized Social"). BitClout's founder and primary leader is known pseudonymously as "diamondhands" (slang for a person who holds an investment in a turbulent market); his real name is Nader al-Naji. 

Under development since 2019, BitClout's blockchain created its first block in January 2021, and BitClout itself launched publicly in March 2021. The platform launched with 15,000 "reserved" accounts - a move intended to prevent impersonation, but which backfired as some people with reserved accounts tried to actively distance themselves. The supply of BitClout's token was fixed in June 2021. Bitclout is a prototype of what can be built on top of the DeSo blockchain.

History

Origins (2019 - March 2021) 
In early 2019, Nader al-Naji became interested in "mixing investing and social media". He started creating a custom blockchain in May 2019, but didn't tell anyone else until November 2020. However, in the fall of 2020, al-Naji pitched BitClout's own investors under his real name and began posting job listings for a "new operation".

Although BitClout was not originally intended to launch until mid-2021, its development was sped up after "zeitgeist about decentralized social media" and "this news about GameStop that ignited a trend towards investing being a more social thing" in January 2021.

BitClout's first block was mined on 18 January 2021. Its next block was mined on 1 March 2021; mining sped up after that point.

As BitClout (March - September 2021) 
In early March 2021, about fifty investors received links to a password-protected website with the BitClout white paper. They were encouraged to explore the site and send the same link to "two or three other 'trusted contacts'". Within weeks users were spending millions of dollars per day on the platform. The platform's founders said they were "completely unprepared", having planned to have a "soft-launch".

On 24 March 2021, BitClout launched out of private beta. Investors include Sequoia Capital, Andreessen Horowitz, the venture capital firm Social Capital, Coinbase Ventures, Winklevoss Capital Management, Alexis Ohanian, Polychain, Pantera, and Digital Currency Group (CoinDesk's parent company). 

On 12 June 2021, the supply of BitClout was capped at around 11 million coins. From this point, coin value is determined by supply and demand.

On 18 July 2021, BitClout added the ability for users to mint and purchase NFTs within the platform.

As part of DeSo (September 2021 - present) 

On 21 September 2021, it was revealed that BitClout was a prototype built on DeSo, short for "Decentralized Social". As a part of this revelation, diamondhands confirmed his identity as Nader al-Naji. The Bitclout project raised $200M in funding, which went to setting up the DeSo Foundation.

Overview 
BitClout is a social media platform. Its users can post short-form writings and photos (similarly to Twitter). They can award money to posts they particularly like by clicking a diamond icon (similarly to Twitch Bits).

The prices of each account's "creator coin" goes up and down with the popularity of the celebrity behind it. For example, if someone says something negative, the value of their corresponding account may go down. This price is computed automatically according to the formula .

At launch time, BitClout scraped 15,000 profiles of celebrities from Twitter to create "reserved" accounts in their names. To claim a reserved account, the account holder would need to tweet about it (which also serves as a marketing strategy). The platform's founder diamondhands states that this was done "to prevent handle squatting and user impersonation". At least 80 such reserved profiles have been claimed. 

BitClout uses proof of work, but is planning to switch to proof of stake.

Controversies 

BitClout's development team made concerted efforts to remain pseudonymous. The leader goes by the name "diamondhands" on the platform. However, as early as April 2021, it had been widely believed that diamondhands is the former Google software engineer Nader al-Naji. In September 2021, Nader al-Naji interviewed with Fast Company under his real name, confirming that he is indeed diamondhands.

During its initial launch, BitClout could not be independently mined and the source code was not published, leading to claims of decentralization being disputed. BitClout coins could only be bought with Bitcoin, but could not be sold on the platform; users could only sell on sites like Discord servers or Twitter threads. However, on 18 May 2021, diamondhands announced that 100% of the BitClout code went public, and the code for BitClout.com became available on GitHub.

Some people with reserved accounts have actively tried to distance themselves from the BitClout platform. For example, in March 2021, law firm Anderson Kill P.C. sent Nader al-Naji, the presumed leader of the BitClout platform, a cease-and-desist letter, demanding the removal of Brandon Curtis's account and alleging that BitClout violated sections 1798 and 3344 of the California Civil Code by using Curtis's name and likeness without his consent. Curtis also tweeted, "Adopting Bitcoin's aesthetic to raise VC funding to carry out unethical and blatantly illegal schemes like BitClout: not cool". (However, Curtis's coin, despite not being listed on the official website, can still be bought by users searching for the original username.) Additionally, in April 2021, Lee Hsien Loong asked for his name and photograph to be removed from the site, stating that he has "nothing to do with the platform" and that "it is misleading and done without [his] permission".

A single bitcoin wallet related to BitClout received more than $165M worth of deposits.

References

External links 
 BitClout official website

Cryptocurrency projects
Social media
Social media management platforms
Computer-related introductions in 2021
Free and open-source software